Bill Daniels (1920–2000) was an American cable television executive and sports team owner.

Bill Daniels may also refer to:

Bill Daniels or Robert Vincent Daniels (1926–2010), American historian
Billy Daniels (1915–1988), American singer
Billy Daniels (footballer) (born 1994), English footballer

See also
Bill Daniel (disambiguation)
William Daniels (disambiguation)